Parliamentary elections were held in Sri Lanka on 5 December 2001, just a little over a year after the previous elections in October 2000.

Background
The People's Alliance (PA) government faced a blow when most of the SLMC MPs left the coalition.  President Chandrika Kumaratunga tried to recruit the JVP to replace it, but this angered several PA MPs, thirteen of which defected to the opposition.  A no-confidence motion was prepared; to forestall this, Kumaratunga called the election.

More than 1,300 incidents of election violence were reported during the campaign.  .  Prime Minister Ratnasiri Wickremanayake was nearly killed by a suicide bomber.  Overall, 60 people were killed in election-related violence, including 14 on polling day.

Parties
 Democratic People's Liberation Front (DFLP)
 Eelam People's Democratic Party (EPDP)
 People's Alliance (Bahejana Nidasa Pakhsaya, BNP), which consisted of:
 Communist Party of Sri Lanka
 Democratic United National Front
 Lanka Sama Samaja Party (Sri Lanka Equal Society Party, LSSP)
 Sri Lanka Freedom Party (Sri Lanka Nidahas Pakshaya, SLNP)
 Sri Lanka Mahajana Pakshaya (Sri Lanka People's Party, SLMP)
 Janatha Vimukthi Peramuna (People's Liberation Front, JVP)
 Sri Lanka Muslim Congress
 Tamil United Liberation Front (Tamil Vimuktasi Peramuna, TVP)
 United National Front, which consisted of:
 United National Party (Eksath Jathika Pakshaya, UNP)
 Ceylon Workers Congress (CWC)

Results
The ruling People's Alliance lost the election, which saw the United National Front win the legislative power.  UNP leader Ranil Wickremesinghe became the new prime minister.

Having the President and Prime Minister belong to two different parties proved to be unstable, and Parliament was dissolved again in 2004, leading to yet another general election.

By province

By electoral district

Elected members

Notes

References

 
 
 
 
 
 
 
 
 
 
 
 
 

 
Parliamentary elections in Sri Lanka
Sri Lanka
Sri Lanka